Đorđe Kadijević (6 January 1933) is a Serbian and Yugoslav film director, screenwriter and art critic. Kadijević is well known for his horror films and for TV series Vuk Karadžić, which won the Grand prix in Rome and was protected as European Intangible Cultural Heritage by UNESCO, on the proposition of Umberto Eco. He was awarded the Sretenje Order by the Republic of Serbia.

Filmography

 Praznik (1967)
 Pohod (1968)
 Heksaptih (1968)
 Darovi moje rođake Marije (1969)
 Žarki (1970)
 Čudo (1971)
 Pukovnikovica (1972)
 Devičanska svirka (1973)
 Štićenik (1973)
 Leptirica (1973)
 Zakletva (1974)
 Marija (1976)
 Beogradska deca (1976)
 Aranđelov udes (1976)
 Čovek koji je pojeo vuka (1981)
 Živo meso (1981)
 Karađorđeva smrt (1983)
 Sveto mesto (1990)
 Napadač (1993)

TV series 
 Vuk Karadžić (1987—1988)
 Poslednja audijencija (2008)

References

External links

Karađorđeva smrt (1983) - full movie

1933 births
Serbian film directors
Yugoslav film directors
Serbs of Croatia
Living people